Jessica Salomé di Iorio is an Argentine lawyer and football referee. She was selected as referee for the 2009 Copa Libertadores de Fútbol Femenino and the women's tournament at the 2012 Olympics. She served as a referee at the 2015 FIFA Women's World Cup. She is also the only woman who has refereed in the Argentine Primera División's reserves league.

References

1980 births
Living people
People from Quilmes
Argentine football referees
Olympic football referees
Football referees at the 2012 Summer Olympics
FIFA Women's World Cup referees
Women association football referees
Argentine sportswomen